Kazan Higher Tank Command School is Russian higher military school conducting commissioned officer programmes (specialitet). It is located in Kazan.

History
The Kazan Tank School was founded in 1941 on the base of the former Kazan Infantry School. It was renamed the Kazan Higher Tank Command School in 1965.

Educational programmes
The School prepares officers for the tank troops of the Ground Forces.

Alumni
 Vladislav Achalov
 Valery Baranov
 Valery Gerasimov
 Gennady Troshev

References

External links
 Official website

Military high schools
1941 establishments in Russia